I Want You Now may refer to:

 "I Want You Now" by Depeche Mode from the 1987 album Music for the Masses
 "I Want You Now" by Liza Minnelli from the 1989 album Results
 "I Want You Now" by Antonis Remos from the 2003 album Mia Anapnoi
 "I Want You Now" by Big Sugar from the 2003 album Hit & Run
 "I Want You Now" by Ultra from the 2006 album The Sun Shines Brighter
 "I Want You Now" by the Sorry Kisses from the 2008 album Hard Drive
 "I Want You Now" by the Feeling from the 2008 album Twelve Stops and Home